Kanchili is a village in Srikakulam district of the Indian state of Andhra Pradesh.

Kanchili mandal is bordered by Kaviti mandal to the north, Odisha state to the west and Sompeta mandal to the south and east.

Demographics
According to Indian census, 2001, the demographic details of Kanchili mandal is as follows:
Total Population: 	59,845	in 13,796 Households
Male Population: 	28,930	and Female Population: 	30,915
Children Under 6-years of age: 8,369	(Boys - 4,322 and Girls - 4,047)
Total Literates: 	29,650

Etymology 

"Kanchili" village has acquired its name from the local village deity "Kanchamma" who is worshiped with devotion by the locals. The residents of Kanchili, as a matter of their social and moral responsibility, renovated the old temple of goddess 'Kanchamma'.

Transport 

It has a Railway station, it is named after a neighboring large mandal "Sompeta". Most of the trains passing through the Howrah - Chennai route halt here. This Railway station falls under East Coast Railways. RAILWAY serves as a major transport of this village. NH-5 Passes through this village. *APSRTC runs a plenty of buses through this village connecting to many cities and villages.

References 

Villages in Srikakulam district
Mandal headquarters in Srikakulam district